Robert Johann Maria König (11 April 1885, Linz – 9 July 1979, Munich) was an Austrian mathematician.

He studied from 1903 to 1907 at the University of Vienna and at the University of Göttingen, where he received his PhD under David Hilbert with thesis Oszillationseigenschaften der Eigenfunktionen der Integralgleichung mit definitem Kern und das Jacobische Kriterium der Variationsrechnung. In 1911 he earned his Habilitation qualification at the University of Leipzig with thesis Konforme Abbildung der Oberfläche einer räumlichen Ecke.

He worked next in Leipzig as assistant and privatdocent. In 1914 he was appointed Ausserordentlicher Professor at the University of Tübingen, where in 1921 he became professor ordinarius. In World War I, he was from 1916 to 1918 a member of the Deputy General Staff in Berlin. From 1919 to 1921 he declined three academic calls then accepted in 1922 a call to be Ordentlicher Professor at the University of Münster as successor to Leon Lichtenstein. From 1922 to 1926, he was assistant to Maximilian Krafft, with whom he wrote the textbook Elliptischen Funktionen. In 1927 König was appointed Ordentlicher Professor and institute director at the University of Jena, where he replaced Paul Koebe. From 1934 to 1943, Friedrich Karl Schmidt and König represented pure mathematics in Jena. In 1934 the Saxon Academy of Sciences in Leipzig elected him as a full member.

Because both Schmid and König were opposed to Nazism, they were involved in disputes over the appointment of new, politically reliable mathematicians at the University of Jena in the Nazi era. After the end of World War II, König went to the Ludwig-Maximilians-Universität München.

At Munich from 1947 to 1950, he was instrumental in offering professorships to Constantin Carathéodory and Eberhard Hopf. From 1950 to 1955, König was Ordentlicher Professor at Munich. In 1953, he was made a full member in the Bayerischen Akademie der Wissenschaften.

His doctoral students include Helmut Röhrl and Karl-Heinrich Weise, with whom he wrote in 1951 a book on geodesy and cartography Mathematische Grundlagen der höheren Geodäsie und Kartographie.

Sources
 Walter Streitfeld: Universitätsprofessor Dr. Robert König. Zum 80. Geburtstag des Mathematikers am 11. April 1965. In: Oberösterreichischer Kulturbericht. 1965, Folge 13

References

20th-century  Austrian mathematicians
1885 births
1979 deaths
Scientists from Linz
University of Vienna alumni
University of Göttingen alumni
Leipzig University alumni
Academic staff of the University of Tübingen
Academic staff of the University of Münster
Academic staff of the University of Jena
Academic staff of the Ludwig Maximilian University of Munich
Austro-Hungarian mathematicians